Aleksei Mikhailovich Sherstnyov (born 1 May 1975) is a Russian professional football coach and a former player. He is the manager of the Under-20 squad of FC Dynamo Moscow.

Playing career
He made his professional debut in the Russian Second Division in 1992 for FC Saturn Ramenskoye. He played one game in the UEFA Intertoto Cup 1997 for FC Dynamo Moscow.

Personal life
His son Stepan Sherstnyov is a professional footballer.

References

1975 births
Sportspeople from Grozny
Living people
Russian footballers
Association football midfielders
Russian football managers
FC Saturn Ramenskoye players
FC Dynamo Moscow players
FC Tyumen players
FK Ventspils players
FC Anzhi Makhachkala players
Russian Premier League players
FC Moscow players
FC Dynamo Stavropol players
Russian expatriate footballers
Expatriate footballers in Latvia
Russian expatriate sportspeople in Latvia
FC Mordovia Saransk players
FC Orenburg players
FC Volga Ulyanovsk players
FC Dynamo Kirov players